Ergys Peposhi (born 26 August 2000) is an Albanian professional footballer who plays as a left winger for Albanian club FK Kukësi.

Career statistics

Club

References

2000 births
Living people
People from Tirana
Association football wingers
Footballers from Tirana
Albanian footballers
FC Kamza players
Akademia e Futbollit players
KF Laçi players
KF Elbasani players
FK Kukësi players
FK Kukësi B players
Kategoria Superiore players
Kategoria e Parë players